Triphala ("three fruits") is an Ayurvedic herbal rasayana formula consisting of equal parts of three myrobalans, taken without seed: Amalaki (Phyllanthus emblica), Bibhitaki (Terminalia bellirica), and Haritaki (Terminalia chebula). It contains vitamin C.

See also
Ayurveda
Rasayana

References

Ayurvedic medicaments